The Limfjord Railway Bridge is a railway bridge  carrying the Vendsyssel railway line across the Limfjord, a shallow sound separating the North Jutlandic Island from the rest of the Jutland Peninsula, between Aalborg and Nørresundby in North Jutland, Denmark.

The current bridge was inaugurated in 1938 and replaced an earlier bridge from 1879.

Name 

Since 2003, Jernbanebroen over Limfjorden has been the official name for the railway bridge between Aalborg and Nørresundby, though colloquially it is simply called Jernbanebroen. Formerly known as Limfjordsbroen, there is a road bridge to the east of the railway bridge, Limfjordsbroen, of the same name.

History 

The Vendsyssel railway line through the historical region of Vendsyssel from Frederikshavn to Nørresundby was opened in 1871. Passengers crossing the Limfjord between Nørresundby station and Aalborg station initially had two opportunities: a ferry or crossing the pontoon bridge located further east on foot.

However, in 1879 the first railway bridge spanning the Limfjord, the Limfjord Railway Bridge, was opened, and the Vendsyssel railway line was connected with Aalborg station, the Randers–Aalborg railway line as well as the rest of the Danish railway network.

The original railway bridge was replaced by the current Limfjord Railway Bridge which was inaugurated on 23 April 1938.

Until 1 January 1997, it belonged to the railway company DSB when DSB was split into DSB and Banedanmark. On 28 March 2012 the bridge was hit by a ship and damaged. The reason was a misunderstanding in the radio communication. The bridge was repaired and opened again for traffic on 29 April 2013.

Features 

It is a steel truss bridge with nine spans supported by seven piers in the water.

Operations
The bridge connects the Aalborg–Frederikshavn railway line with the Randers–Aalborg railway line as well as the rest of the Danish railway network. The bridge opens 4,000 times a year, and there are 10,000 annual sailings under it.

References

External links

 Banedanmark – government agency responsible for maintenance and traffic control of most of the Danish railway network

Bridges completed in 1938
Bridges in Denmark
Railway bridges in Denmark
Truss bridges in Denmark
Buildings and structures in Aalborg Municipality
Limfjord